Heinz Melkus (20 April 1928 – 5 September 2005) was an East German race car driver and constructor of sport cars.

He founded the company Melkus to produce race and sport cars, his Wartburg based Melkus RS 1000 was with 101 build units the most successful one.

His sons, Ulli and Peter Melkus have resumed to build sports cars in 2006.

Racing record
 1958 East German champion in Formula 3 up to 500 cc
 1960 East German champion in Formula Junior up to 1000 cc
 1963, 1965, 1966, 1967, 1972 Winner of the Main event of the Friendship of Socialist Countries Cup
 1967, 1968, 1972 East German champion in Formula 3/Class C 9/Class B 8/ E up to 1300 cc

Literature 
 Horst Ihling: BMW (Ost), EMW, Wartburg. Autorennsport in der DDR. Delius Klasing, Bielefeld 2006, .
 Wolfgang Melenk: Heinz Melkus. Fahrlehrer, Konstrukteur und Rennfahrer. Festschrift zum 75. Geburtstag. Limbacher Druck GmbH, without ISBN.
 Wolfgang Melenk, Frank Rönicke: Meister des Sports. Der Automobilrennsport in der DDR. Motorbuch-Verlag, Stuttgart 2004, .
 Wolfgang Melenk, Mike Jordan: Rennsportlegende Heinz Melkus. Lebenswerk und Sportkarriere des Dresdner Automobilkonstrukteurs und Autorennfahrers. Delius Klasing, Bielefeld 2008, .

German racing drivers
1928 births
2005 deaths
Sportspeople from Dresden
Racing drivers from Saxony
East German racing drivers